Capalaba West was an outer suburb of Brisbane, Queensland, Australia, located  east of the CBD.

The Capalaba region was initially settled in 1859 when the Queensland Government offered incentives to encourage immigration. 

The Department of Environment and Resource Management sought public comment on the proposal to discontinue the use of the name Capalaba West as a suburb and to include the area in the adjoining suburb of Chandler. On 30 April 2010, Capalaba West was absorbed into the suburb of Chandler.

References

External links
 
 
 
 

Brisbane localities
Capalaba, Queensland